George Wilkins is an American soundtrack composer who has created several noteworthy scores and songs for Walt Disney Parks and Resorts.

Career 
Wilkins got his start in the music industry as a backup vocalist and vocal arranger for Patti Page during the 1950s. In the 1960s, he also co-founded the vocal group the Doodletown Pipers. By this time, Wilkins broke out as a composer for film and television with his work on the Rankin/Bass productions of Return to Oz (1964) and The Wacky World of Mother Goose (1967).

In 1979, Wilkins joined The Walt Disney Company as a protégé to composer Buddy Baker. Throughout his time at Disney, Wilkins acted as both a  "Composer in Residence" at Walt Disney Productions as well as the Director of Music for Walt Disney Imagineering.

Credits

References

External links 
 

1930 births
20th-century American composers
20th-century American conductors (music)
20th-century classical composers
21st-century American composers
21st-century American conductors (music)
21st-century classical composers
American classical composers
American contemporary classical composers
American film score composers
American male classical composers
American male conductors (music)
American television composers
Disney imagineers
Disney music
Disney people
Living people
American male film score composers
Walt Disney Theatrical